Denzel Hall (born 22 May 2001) is a Dutch professional footballer who plays as a right back for Eerste Divisie club ADO Den Haag, on loan from Feyenoord.

Career
Born in Rotterdam, Hall came through the Feyenoord Academy and, in December 2020, signed a contract until summer 2024. He made his Eredivisie debut as an 85th-minute substitute in a 4–1 win at NEC Nijmegen on 23 January 2022.

On 28 July 2022, Hall was loaned to ADO Den Haag.

On 28 October 2022, Hall scored his first senior goal in ADO Den Haag's 2-1 loss to Helmond Sport.

Personal life
Born in the Netherlands, Hall is of Jamaican descent.

Career statistics

References

2001 births
Living people
Footballers from Rotterdam
Dutch footballers
Dutch people of Jamaican descent
Association football fullbacks
Feyenoord players
ADO Den Haag players
Eredivisie players
Eerste Divisie players